Giacomo David (born Giacomo Davide; 1750 in Presezzo – 1830 in Bergamo), was a leading Italian tenor of the late 18th and early 19th centuries.

Biography
Probably self-taught as a singer, he studied composition in Naples with Nicola Sala, and began his career in the early 1770s appearing on the stages of major Italian theatres such as the Teatro Regio in Turin, the Teatro San Carlo in Naples, and the Teatro San Benedetto in Venice. Here he participated in the  inauguration of the newly erected theatre La Fenice, in 1792, performing the role of Eraclide in Paisiello's I giochi di Agrigento. After having made his debut at Milan's Teatro alla Scala in 1782, he became a regular performer there at the beginning of the new century.

In 1791 Davide travelled to London, where the -e in his surname seems to have been dropped, and where he appeared at the King's Theatre as the protagonist of Paisiello's Pirro, one of his favourite roles. On 17 May 1791, he took part in a charity concert in the Hannover Square Rooms,  where he executed the tenor aria "Cara deh torna", specially composed for the occasion by Joseph Haydn.

In 1801, he took part in the inauguration of Trieste's Regio Teatro Nuovo, performing two premières on 20 and 21 April: Antonio Salieri's Annibale in Capua (Scipione) and Simon Mayr's Ginevra di Scozia (Polinesso).

His career was very long, continuing into the early twenty years of the 19th century,  with a repertoire based upon such composers as Paisiello, Mayr, Ferdinando Bertoni, Domenico Cimarosa, Pietro Alessandro Guglielmi, Giuseppe Sarti, Niccolò Antonio Zingarelli, and Francesco Bianchi. In many operas he worked alongside the castrati Girolamo Crescentini and Gaspare Pacchierotti, and the soprano Brigida Banti, who shared common artistic trends with him.

In France, where he appeared opposite Isabella Colbran in Otello, David came to be known as Giacomo le père ("Giacomo the father"), because his son Giovanni David was also pursuing a successful career in opera.

David can be considered as the initiator of the Bergamo tenor school which was going to produce such notable singers as Andrea Nozzari and Giacomo's aforesaid son, Giovanni (who were also actual pupils of his), Domenico Donzelli, Giovanni Battista Rubini, and Marco Bordogni.

David died in 1830.

Artistic features
Giacomo David represents the typical baritonal tenor of the late 18th century, gifted with remarkable voice volume, but not lacking in high-pitching capability, though singing sharp notes in falsettone. He had mastery of coloratura for which he was famous: "he was able to compete with the castratos in the florid music and far exceed them in his dramatic intensity", and, by 1786 he was the first tenor in the history of Turin's Teatro Regio that was paid more than the primo uomo during the carnival season. "Here was a sign that, with the castrati in decline, the tenor voice was beginning to engage the audience's interest as more than the stereotype utterance of kings and old men ...". In fact, David's popularity was enormous and, along with his contemporaries, Matteo Babini and Giovanni Ansani, he contributed "[to lay] the foundation of the forthcoming myth of the tenor" which would be established during the Romantic era.

Operatic roles
The list below is not exhaustive, but includes his most significant performances.

References
Notes

Sources
 This article is a substantial translation from Giacomo David in the Italian Wikipedia.

  Salvatore Caruselli (ed.), Grande enciclopedia della musica lirica, Longanesi &C. Periodici S.p.A., Roma, ad nomen
 Rodolfo Celletti, A history of Bel Canto, Oxford University Press (Clarendon Paperbacks), U.K., 1996, 
 Elizabeth Forbes, "Davide [David], Giacomo", in Stanley Sadie (ed.), The New Grove Dictionary of Opera, Grove (Oxford University Press), New York, 1997, I, p. 1088, 

1750 births
1830 deaths
Italian operatic tenors
Musicians from the Province of Bergamo
18th-century Italian male opera singers
19th-century Italian male opera singers